Rachel Szalay is an Australian actress and artist.

She has an acting diploma from the National Institute of Dramatic Art in Sydney.

As well as other stage roles, Rachel Szalay appeared in the stage production of "The Importance of Being Earnest" as "Cecily Cardew", which she joined in 1990. The production was so popular that it was an ongoing stage production between 1988 and 1992, and was televised by the ABC. Her film credits include roles in The Delinquents (1989), Mad Bomber in Love (1992) and Lilian's Story (1996).

References 
Rachel Szalay – Stage acting credits
"The Importance of Being Earnest" — (information and photos): 

External links 

Australian stage actresses
Australian television actresses
Living people
Year of birth missing (living people)